This is a comparison of standards of mobile phones. A new generation of cellular standards has appeared approximately every tenth year since 1G systems were introduced in 1979 and the early to mid-1980s.

Issues
Global System for Mobile Communications (GSM, around 80–85% market share) and IS-95 (around 10–15% market share) were the two most prevalent 2G mobile communication technologies in 2007. In 3G, the most prevalent technology was UMTS with CDMA-2000 in close contention.

All radio access technologies have to solve the same problems: to divide the finite RF spectrum among multiple users as efficiently as possible. GSM uses TDMA and FDMA for user and cell separation. UMTS, IS-95 and CDMA-2000 use CDMA. WiMAX and LTE use OFDM.

 Time-division multiple access (TDMA)  provides multiuser access by chopping up the channel into sequential time slices. Each user of the channel takes turns to transmit and receive signals. In reality, only one person is actually using the channel at a specific moment.  This is analogous to time-sharing on a large computer server.
 Frequency-division multiple access (FDMA) provides multiuser access by separating the used frequencies. This is used in GSM to separate cells, which then use TDMA to separate users within the cell.
 Code-division multiple access (CDMA)  This uses a digital modulation called spread spectrum which spreads the voice data over a very wide channel in pseudorandom fashion using a user or cell specific pseudorandom code. The receiver undoes the randomization to collect the bits together and produce the original data. As the codes are pseudorandom and selected in such a way as to cause minimal interference to one another, multiple users can talk at the same time and multiple cells can share the same frequency. This causes an added signal noise forcing all users to use more power, which in exchange decreases cell range and battery life.
 Orthogonal frequency-division multiple access (OFDMA) uses bundling of multiple small frequency bands that are orthogonal to one another to provide for separation of users. The users are multiplexed in the frequency domain by allocating specific sub-bands to individual users. This is often enhanced by also performing TDMA and changing the allocation periodically so that different users get different sub-bands at different times.

In theory, CDMA, TDMA and FDMA have exactly the same spectral efficiency but practically, each has its own challenges – power control in the case of CDMA, timing in the case of TDMA, and frequency generation/filtering in the case of FDMA.

For a classic example for understanding the fundamental difference of TDMA and CDMA, imagine a cocktail party where couples are talking to each other in a single room.  The room represents the available bandwidth:

TDMA: A speaker takes turns talking to a listener. The speaker talks for a short time and then stops to let another couple talk. There is never more than one speaker talking in the room, no one has to worry about two conversations mixing. The drawback is that it limits the practical number of discussions in the room (bandwidth wise).

CDMA: any speaker can talk at any time; however each uses a different language. Each listener can only understand the language of their partner.  As more and more couples talk, the background noise (representing the noise floor) gets louder, but because of the difference in languages, conversations do not mix. The drawback is that at some point, one cannot talk any louder. After this if the noise still rises (more people join the party/cell) the listener cannot make out what the talker is talking about without coming closer to the talker. In effect, CDMA cell coverage decreases as the number of active users increases. This is called cell breathing.

Comparison table

Strengths and weaknesses of IS-95 and GSM

Advantages of GSM 

 Less signal deterioration inside buildings.
 Ability to use repeaters.
 Talktime is generally higher in GSM phones due to the pulse nature of transmission.
 The availability of Subscriber Identity Modules allows users to switch networks and handsets at will, aside from a subsidy lock.
 GSM covers virtually all parts of the world so international roaming is not a problem.
 The much bigger number of subscribers globally creates a better network effect for GSM handset makers, carriers and end users.

Disadvantages of GSM 

 Interferes with some electronics, especially certain audio amplifiers.
 Intellectual property is concentrated among a few industry participants, creating barriers to entry for new entrants and limiting competition among phone manufacturers. Situation is however worse in CDMA-based systems like IS-95, where Qualcomm is the major IP holder.
 GSM has a fixed maximum cell site range of 120 km, which is imposed by technical limitations.  This is expanded from the old limit of 35 km.

Advantages of IS-95 

 Capacity is IS-95's biggest asset; it can accommodate more users per MHz of bandwidth than any other technology.
 Has no built-in limit to the number of concurrent users.
 Uses precise clocks that do not limit the distance a tower can cover.
 Consumes less power and covers large areas so cell size in IS-95 is larger.
 Able to produce a reasonable call with lower signal (cell phone reception) levels.
 Uses soft handoff, reducing the likelihood of dropped calls.
 IS-95's variable rate voice coders reduce the rate being transmitted when speaker is not talking, which allows the channel to be packed more efficiently.
 Has a well-defined path to higher data rates.

Disadvantages of IS-95 

 Most technologies are patented and must be licensed from Qualcomm.
 Breathing of base stations, where coverage area shrinks under load. As the number of subscribers using a particular site goes up, the range of that site goes down.
 Because IS-95 towers interfere with each other, they are normally installed on much shorter towers.  Because of this, IS-95 may not perform well in hilly terrain.
 USSD, PTT, concatenated/E-sms are not supported by IS-95/CDMA
 IS-95 covers a smaller portion of the world, and IS-95 phones are generally unable to roam internationally.
 Manufacturers are often hesitant to release IS-95 devices due to the smaller market, so features are sometimes late in coming to IS-95 devices.
 Even barring subsidy locks, CDMA phones are linked by ESN to a specific network, thus phones are typically not portable across providers.

Development of the market share of mobile standards 

This graphic compares the market shares of the different mobile standards.

In a fast-growing market, GSM/3GSM (red) grows faster than the market and is gaining market share, the CDMA family (blue) grows at about the same rate as the market, while other technologies (grey) are being phased out

Comparison of wireless Internet standards
As a reference, a comparison of mobile and non-mobile wireless Internet standards follows.

See also 

 Comparison of wireless data standards
 Spectral efficiency comparison table
 SMS – contain the content of its standardization

References 

 
Mobile phone standards